Nationality words link to articles with information on the nation's poetry or literature (for instance, Irish or France).

Events
1010:
 March 8 - Persian poet Ferdowsi finishes writing the Shahnameh (Book of Kings) which will be regarded as the national epic of the greater Iranian culture.

Births
Death years link to the corresponding "[year] in poetry" article. There are conflicting or unreliable sources for the birth years of many people born in this period; where sources conflict, the poet is listed again and the conflict is noted:

1011:
 Shao Yong (died 1077), Song Chinese philosopher, cosmologist, poet and historian

1012:
 Cai Xiang (died 1067), Song poet scholar and vizier of the Seljuq Empire

1018:
 Nizam al-Mulk (died 1092), Persian
 Michael Psellos born 1017 or 1018 (died 1078), Byzantine poet and historian (1017 or 1018)

1019:
 Zeng Gong (died 1083), Song poet

Deaths
Birth years link to the corresponding "[year] in poetry" article:
1012:
 Shams al-Mo'ali Abol-hasan Ghaboos ibn Wushmgir (born unknown), author of the Qabus nama

See also

 Poetry
 11th century in poetry
 11th century in literature
 List of years in poetry

Other events:
 Other events of the 12th century
 Other events of the 13th century

11th century:
 11th century in poetry
 11th century in literature

Notes

11th-century poetry
Poetry